Eric Schaefer, Ph.D., (born 1959) is a professor and film historian.  He is an associate professor at Emerson College and interim chair of the visual and media arts department. 

He has a B.A. from Webster University, and an M.A. and Ph.D. from the University of Texas, Austin.

He is best known for his book on exploitation filmmaking, Bold! Daring! Shocking! True: A History of Exploitation Films, 1919-1959, published by Duke University Press in 1999. He has been described as "the go-to academic source on the genre of exploitation films." 

He is a member of the Northeast Historic Film board of advisors and a member of the editorial board of the journal The Moving Image.

Selected works

 Bold! Daring! Shocking! True": A History of Exploitation Films, 1919-1959 (1999) - Duke University Press.
 "Plain Brown Wrapper: Adult Films for the Home Market, 1930-1970",  In the Absence of Films: Towards a New Historiographic Practice, Eric Smoodin and Jon Lewis, editors, Duke University Press.
 "Gauging a Revolution: 16mm Film and the Rise of the Pornographic Feature".  Cinema Journal - 41, Number 3, Spring 2002, pp. 3–26.
"Dirty Little Secrets: Scholars, Archivists, and Dirty Movies".  The Moving Image'' - Volume 5, Number 2, Fall 2005, pp. 79–105

References

Emerson College faculty
Webster University alumni
Living people
1959 births